The 2006 Supercheap Auto Bathurst 1000 was an endurance race for V8 Supercars, held on 8 October 2006 at the Mount Panorama Circuit near Bathurst in New South Wales, Australia. It was Round 9 of the 2006 V8 Supercar Championship Series. The event was the tenth running of the "Australia 1000" race, first held after the organisational split over the Bathurst 1000 that occurred in 1997. It was also the 49th race in a sequence of endurance events beginning with the 1960 Armstrong 500 held at Phillip Island.

The race was won by Craig Lowndes and Jamie Whincup driving a Ford Falcon (BA) entered by Team Betta Electrical. It was Whincup's first "Bathurst 1000" win following on from his second place in the 2005 Supercheap Auto 1000. Whincup became the 51st driver to win in the combined history of the race. It was Lowndes second win, achieved ten years after his 1996 AMP Bathurst 1000 victory. It was also the first "1000" win for Triple Eight Race Engineering, which first contested the event in 1997, and the first for a Ford since 1998. The race winners were awarded the Peter Brock Trophy, commemorating the recent death of nine time "Bathurst 1000" winner, Peter Brock.

Entry list
31 cars were entered for the race, with 15 of them Ford Falcons and 16 Holden Commodores. 2005 winners Mark Skaife and Todd Kelly were split between the two factory Holden teams, despite racing as team-mates during the regular season.

Support race accident 
During Race 1 of the Fujitsu V8 Supercars Series There was a multiple-car crash involving Mark Porter, who was seriously injured and would die Monday after the race. Porter qualified the #12 Falcon for Brad Jones Racing. His name was left on the window of the BJR Falcon as a mark of respect.

Qualifying

Qualifying

Top ten shootout

Starting grid
The following table represents the final starting grid for the race on Sunday:

Race results

*Mark Porter practiced in the #12 Falcon, but was injured in a serious crash in a support race on the Friday before the race. Michael Caruso was drafted into the team so the car could race.  Porter would die on the Sunday afternoon from the injuries in the crash.

References

Statistics
 Provisional Pole Position - #2 Mark Skaife - 2:06.9764
 Pole Position - #2 Mark Skaife - 2:07.4221
 Fastest Lap - #888 Craig Lowndes - 2:08.6571 (new lap record)
 Average Speed - 143 km/h

External links
 Official race results 
 Official V8 Supercar website

Motorsport in Bathurst, New South Wales
Supercheap Auto 1000